The northern death adder (Acanthophis praelongus) is a species of venomous snake in the family Elapidae.

The northern death adder lives in Australia and Papua New Guinea. It hunts birds, amphibians, and small mammals both by day and night. Though it resembles a viper, it belongs to a group of snakes that includes cobras and mambas.

Venom 
The venom of the northern death adder is highly potent against the human organism. It contains pre- and postsynaptic neurotoxins, possibly myotoxins and anticoagulants as well. An envenoming by this snake is very dangerous, and all bites should be treated as medical emergencies. Main effects include local pain and flaccid paralysis, death can be caused by respiratory failure. In the case of systemic effects of envenoming key treatment is based on antivenom applications ('Polyvalent Snake Antivenom (Australia - New Guinea)' CSL Limited, 'Death Adder Antivenom', CSL Limited).

Habitat 
Northern death adders can be found in a wide range of habitats, including mangroves, tropical and subtropical moist broadleaf forests, tropical and subtropical grasslands, savannas, and shrubland.

References 

Acanthophis
Reptiles of Western Australia
Reptiles of Indonesia
Reptiles of Papua New Guinea
Taxa named by Edward Pierson Ramsay
Reptiles described in 1877
Snakes of Australia
Snakes of New Guinea